Ellis Island is a 1936 American crime film directed by Phil Rosen and starring Donald Cook, Peggy Shannon and Jack La Rue.

Plot
Donald Cook and Johnny Arthur portray INS deportation officers at the Ellis Island immigrant station.

Cast
 Donald Cook as Gary Curtis  
 Peggy Shannon as Betty Parker  
 Jack La Rue as Dude
 Johnny Arthur as Kip Andrews
 Joyce Compton as Adele  
 Bradley Page as Solo    
 George Rosener as Uncle Ted Kedrich  
 Maurice Black as Nails   
 Bryant Washburn as Peter James
 E.H. Calvert as Mr. Carson, Commissioner of Ellis Island
 Matty Fain as Turk 
 Monte Vandergrift as Moxey
 Lew Kelly as Farmer
 Ann Brody as Matron

References

Bibliography
 Michael R. Pitts. Poverty Row Studios, 1929-1940: An Illustrated History of 55 Independent Film Companies, with a Filmography for Each. McFarland & Company, 2005.

External links
 

1936 films
1936 crime films
American crime films
Films directed by Phil Rosen
Chesterfield Pictures films
American black-and-white films
1930s English-language films
1930s American films